Cyperus gubanii is a species of sedge that is native to parts eastern Africa.

See also 
 List of Cyperus species

References 

gubanii
Plants described in 2005
Flora of Somalia